Óscar Mingueza García (born 13 May 1999) is a Spanish  association football player who plays as a defender for La Liga club Celta Vigo and the Spain national team. Mainly a centre-back, he can also play in either full-back position, mostly as a right-back.

Club career

Barcelona
Born in Santa Perpètua de Mogoda, Barcelona, Catalonia, Mingueza joined Barcelona's La Masia academy in 2007 from Santa Perpètua. He won the UEFA Youth League with the club's Juvenil A team in 2018, and moved up to Barcelona B for the 2018–19 season.

Mingueza made his first-team debut for Barcelona on 24 November 2020, as a replacement for the injured Gerard Piqué, starting the 4–0 2020–21 UEFA Champions League group stage victory against Dynamo Kyiv at the NSC Olimpiyskiy in Kyiv. Five days later, he made his La Liga debut in a 4–0 win against Osasuna at Camp Nou. On 15 March 2021, Mingueza scored his first goal for Barcelona in a 4–1 home win over Huesca in La Liga. He scored his second career goal in the 60th minute of El Clásico on 10 April 2021. One week later, he won his first professional title, after winning the 2020–21 Copa del Rey against Athletic Bilbao.

Celta Vigo
On 31 July 2022, Mingueza joined fellow La Liga side Celta Vigo on a permanent four-year deal for a reported fee of €3 million.

International career
Due to the isolation of some national team players following the positive COVID-19 test of Sergio Busquets, Spain's under-21 squad were called up for the international friendly against Lithuania on 8 June 2021. Mingueza made his senior debut in the match as Spain won 4–0. Later that month, he was included in Spain's preliminary squad for the 2020 Summer Olympics.

Personal life
Óscar's younger sister, Ariadna, is also a professional footballer having made her debut for Barcelona's women's team on 6 March 2021.

Career statistics

Club

Honours
Barcelona
Copa del Rey: 2020–21
UEFA Youth League: 2017–18

Spain U23
Summer Olympic silver medal: 2020

References

External links

1999 births
Living people
People from Vallès Occidental
Sportspeople from the Province of Barcelona
Spanish footballers
Footballers from Catalonia
Association football defenders
La Liga players
Segunda División B players
FC Barcelona Atlètic players
FC Barcelona players
Spain under-21 international footballers
Spain international footballers
Olympic footballers of Spain
Footballers at the 2020 Summer Olympics
Olympic medalists in football
Olympic silver medalists for Spain
Medalists at the 2020 Summer Olympics
Catalonia international footballers